Pamela Charlette is a Seychellois politician who served as the Minister of Habitat, Lands, Infrastructure, and Land Transport between 27 April 2018 and 3 November 2020.

Previously Charlette served as Minister of Fisheries and Agriculture from 7 July 2017 to 27 April 2018 after being principal secretary for Entrepreneurial Development and Business innovation.

References

Living people
Seychellois women in politics
People from Anse-aux-Pins
United Seychelles Party politicians
Year of birth missing (living people)
Women government ministers of Seychelles